Paul Lawrence may refer to:

 Paul Ogden Lawrence (1861–1952), British barrister and judge
 Paul R. Lawrence (1922–2011), American sociologist

See also
Paul Laurence (born 1958), American songwriter, producer and keyboardist